NGC 7043 Is a barred spiral galaxy located about 200 million light-years away in the constellation of Pegasus. NGC 7043 is part of a pair of galaxies that contains the galaxy NGC 7042. It has an estimated diameter of 73,100 light-years. NGC 7043 was discovered by astronomer Albert Marth on August 18, 1863.

See also 
 Barred spiral galaxy
 List of NGC objects (7001–7840)

References

External links 

Barred spiral galaxies
Pegasus (constellation)
7043
11704
66385
Astronomical objects discovered in 1863